Rufat Jabrayil oghlu Aslanli (born November 15, 1970), also spelled as Rufat Aslanly is an Azerbaijani official who serves as the Chairman of Board of Directors of Financial Markets Supervision Authority.

Early life
Aslanli was born on November 15, 1970 in Baku, Azerbaijan. He graduated from Azerbaijan State Economic University in 1993. In 1993–1994, he worked as Senior Economist at Agro-Industrial Bank. In 1994, he was hired by the National Bank of Azerbaijan as Senior Economist at its Credit Policies and Currency Regulation Department. In 1998, he was appointed Director of Foreign Currency Department. In 2000, Aslanli was promoted to the position of Director of Department for Management of Credit Organizations.

Political career
In December 2001, according to the decision of the National Assembly of Azerbaijan, he was elected to the board of directors of the National Bank of Azerbaijan. On May 18, 2006 he was appointed the Director of the National Bank. In December 2006, he was re-elected to the board of directors of the bank. In February 2007, he was appointed Deputy Chairman of Board of Directors of the National Bank. On November 19, 2008 Aslanli was appointed the Chairman of State Committee for Securities of Azerbaijan Republic. On March 10, 2016 he was appointed the Chairman of Board of Directors of Financial Markets Supervision Authority 

He's married and has three children.

See also
Cabinet of Azerbaijan
Baku Stock Exchange

References 

1970 births
Living people
Government ministers of Azerbaijan
Businesspeople from Baku
Azerbaijan State University of Economics alumni